The Hôtel de Noirmoutier is a hôtel particulier in Paris, France. It was built in 1723. It has been listed by the French Ministry of Culture since February 12, 1996.

The mansion served as a model for Spencer Hays's residence in Nashville, Tennessee.

References

Noirmoutier
Houses completed in 1723
Monuments historiques of Paris